Tetragonoceras is an extinct prehistoric nautiloid genus from the nautilid family Tetragonoceratidae that lived during the Middle Devonian, found in Canada.

Tetragonoceras has an openly spiralled, gyroconic shell with an almost square cross section, but with the venter on the outer rim broader than the dorsum on the inner. The sides are flattish and converge slightly on the dorsum and the ventro-lateral shoulders are angular.  The suture of Tetragonoceras has slight lateral and ventral lobes separated  by subangular saddles. The siphuncle is ventral and tubular. ( 1964.). A member of the Tetragonoceratidae, Tetragonoceras is also a component of the superfamily Tainocerataceae.

References
 , B. 1964. Nautiloidea-Nautilida in the Treatise on Invertebrate Paleontology Part K; Geological Society of America and University of Kansas Press. 
 Sepkoski, J.J. Jr. 2002. A compendium of fossil marine animal genera. D.J. Jablonski & M.L. Foote (eds.). Bulletins of American Paleontology 363: 1–560.  
 Tetragonoceras  in Paleobiology Database 

Nautiloids